This is an episodes' list of The Cramp Twins, a Cartoon Network European original animated series created by Brian Wood.

Episodes

Season 1

Season 2

References

External links
 

Lists of British animated television series episodes
Lists of American children's animated television series episodes